Mountelgonia percivali is a moth of the family Cossidae. It is found from the areas east of the summits of Mount Elgon to the western highlands of Kenya. It is probably also found on the western side of Mount Elgon in Uganda. The habitat consists of dry Afromontane forest at high altitudes.

The wingspan is about 22 mm for males and 26.5 mm for females. The forewings are sepia and yellow ochre below the cell and near the base. The hindwings are glossy ivory yellow.

Etymology
The species is named after the naturalist Arthur Blayney Percival.

References

Moths described in 2013
Mountelgonia
Moths of Africa